Stephen King is an Anglican priest: he has been  Archdeacon of Wellington since December 2015: he was previously Archdeacon for Mission and Vicar of Roseneath.

References

Archdeacons of Wellington
Living people
Year of birth missing (living people)